Save My Reno is a Canadian television series featuring contractor Sebastian Clovis, a former Canadian Football League player, and designer Samantha Pynn helping homeowners complete needed renovations on a limited budget.

The series premiered in 2014 under the title Tackle My Reno, featuring Clovis assisting homeowners with renovations on his own. A single season was produced before the show was relaunched in 2016 as Save My Reno, with Clovis and Sabrina Smelko hosting the retooled show as a duo; after two seasons, Smelko left the show, with Pynn replacing her when the fourth season aired in 2020.

Following a second season in 2021, the show ended and Clovis launched the new series Gut Job. Unlike the format of Save My Reno, in Gut Job Clovis works with a variety of different designers on different projects rather than a single consistent co-host, although Pynn has appeared as the designer on some episodes of the show.

Broadcast
The series premiered on HGTV Canada in Canada on 26 August 2014 with two episodes airing back-to-back each week.

Internationally, the series premiered in Australia on 21 August 2015.

References

External links
 

HGTV (Canada) original programming
2014 Canadian television series debuts
2010s Canadian reality television series
2020s Canadian reality television series